Mandres-sur-Vair (literally Mandres on Vair) is a commune in the Vosges département in Grand Est in northeastern France.

Inhabitants are called Mandrions.

Unusual feature
The private school "Bienheureux Frassati" opened to students in 2007.  The school, which takes its name from Pier Giorgio Frassati, is a traditional Roman Catholic school for boys, installed in a former château.

See also
Communes of the Vosges department

References

Communes of Vosges (department)